Jan Mayen is a Norwegian volcanic island in the Arctic Ocean with no permanent population. The island is mountainous, the highest summit being the Beerenberg volcano in the north. The isthmus is the location of the two largest lakes of the island, Sørlaguna (South Lagoon) and Nordlaguna (North Lagoon). A third lake is called Ullerenglaguna (Ullereng Lagoon). Jan Mayen was formed by the Jan Mayen hotspot and is defined by geologists as a microcontinent.

Although administered separately, in the ISO 3166-1 standard, Jan Mayen and Svalbard are collectively designated as Svalbard and Jan Mayen, with the two-letter country code "SJ".

Natural resources

Jan Mayen Island has one exploitable natural resource, gravel, from a site located at Trongskaret. Other than this, economic activity is limited to providing services for employees of Norway's radio communications and meteorological stations located on the island. The  coast has no ports or harbours, only offshore anchorages.

There are important fishing resources, and the existence of Jan Mayen establishes a large exclusive economic zone around it. Norway has found large deposits of minerals along the Mid-Atlantic Ridge between Jan Mayen and soutern Svalbard/Bear Island, including copper, zinc, cobalt, gold and silver. The expeditons have also discovered high concentrations of lithium and rare earth metal scandium. In total, it is estimated that the amount of copper could amount to 21.7 million tonnes, but other estimates are around 7 million tonnes. License for deep sea mining is now under consideration. A dispute between Norway and Denmark regarding the fishing exclusion zone between Jan Mayen and Greenland was settled in 1988 granting Denmark the greater area of sovereignty. Geologists suspect significant deposits of petroleum and natural gas lie below Jan Mayen's surrounding seafloors.

Status

Jan Mayen Island is an integral part of the Kingdom of Norway. Since 1995, Jan Mayen has been administered by the County Governor (statsforvalter) of the northern Norwegian county of Nordland, to which it is closest. However, some authority over Jan Mayen has been assigned to the station commander of the Norwegian Defence Logistics Organisation, a branch of the Norwegian Armed Forces.

Society

Demography 

The only inhabitants on the island are personnel working for the Norwegian Armed Forces and the Norwegian Meteorological Institute. Eighteen people spend the winter on the island, but the population may roughly double (35) during the summer, when heavy maintenance is performed. Personnel serve either six months or one year and are exchanged twice a year in April and October. The support crew, including mechanics, cooks, and a nurse, are among the military personnel. The military personnel operated a Loran-C base until it closed at the end of 2015. Both the LORAN transmitter and the meteorological station are located a few kilometres away from the settlement Olonkinbyen (Olonkin Town), where all personnel live.

Transport
Transport to the island is provided by C-130 Hercules military transport planes operated by the Royal Norwegian Air Force that land at Jan Mayensfield's gravel runway. The planes fly in from Bodø Main Air Station eight times a year. Since the airport does not have any instrument landing capabilities, good visibility is required, and it is not uncommon for the planes to have to return to Bodø, two hours away, without landing. For heavy goods, freight ships visit during the summer, but since there are no harbours, the ships must anchor.

Communication
The island has no indigenous population but is assigned the ISO 3166-1 alpha-2 country code SJ (together with Svalbard). It uses the Internet country code top-level domain (ccTLD) .no (.sj is allocated but not used) and data code JN. Jan Mayen has telephone and internet connection over satellite, using Norwegian telephone numbers (country code 47). Its amateur radio call sign prefix is JX. It has a postal code, NO-8099 JAN MAYEN, but delivery time varies, especially during the winter.

Business 
There are no exploitable resources on Jan Mayen, except fish in the surrounding waters of the Island. The economic activity is limited to the operation of the station that is manned by the Norwegian Cyberdefence and the Metereological Agency of Norway. There has also been established a reference station for EGNOS. There is also a reference station for the satellite navigation system Galileo on Jan Mayen. There was also an earlier Jan Mayen LORAN-C Transmitter, but the transmitter is now decommissioned and demolished.

Jan Mayen Radio 
Jan Mayen Radio was a Norwegian coastal radio station on Jan Mayen.

The first radiostation was built in 1921 on a part of the island called "Eldsmetten - Norwegian" on the eastern side of the Island. The radiostation consisted of a 3 kW Telefunken Spark-gap transmitter and a 55meter (180,5Ft) wooden radiomast.

The station was destroyed by Norwegian forces in September 1940, and the crew was sendt to Iceland.

In 1941 a new radiostation was constructed on the western side of the island, it was moved to a plateau above. 

In 1962 this station was again moved to "Helenesanden - Norwegian" about 3 km north from the Norwegian army's LORAN-station.

In 1984 the station was moved to the Norwegian army's station. In 1989 there was an VHF-receiver installed, and later in 1994 was a MF-Digital-Selcall-receiver installed and is now controlled remotely from Bodø-Radio. The station is now controlled remotly via satellite, but can be taken in local control by a disconnection against Eik Satellite Earth Station.

History

Unverified "discoveries" of a terra nullius

Between the fifth and ninth centuries (400–900 AD), numerous communities of monks originating in Ireland (Papar) navigated throughout the north Atlantic in leather boats, exploring and sometimes settling in distant islands where their monastic communities could be separated from close contact with others. Strong indicators exist of their presence in the Faroe Islands and Iceland before the arrival of the Vikings, and medieval Gaelic chronicles such as the famous Voyage of Saint Brendan the Abbot testify to the extensive interest in exploration at the time. A modern-day trans-Atlantic journey proved the ability of the early navigators to reach all lands of the north Atlantic even further from Ireland than Jan Mayen – and, given favorable winds, at a speed roughly equal to that of modern yachts. Though quite feasible, there is nevertheless no direct physical trace of medieval landings or settlement on Jan Mayen.

The land named Svalbarð ("cold coast") by the Vikings in the early medieval book Landnámabók may have been Jan Mayen (instead of Spitsbergen, renamed Svalbard by the Norwegians in modern times); the distance from Iceland to Svalbarð mentioned in this book is two days' sailing (with favorable winds), consistent with the approximate  to Jan Mayen and not with the minimum  to Spitsbergen. However much Jan Mayen may have been known in Europe at that time, it was subsequently forgotten for some centuries.

In the 17th century, many claims of the island's rediscovery were made, spurred by the rivalry on the Arctic whaling grounds, and the island received many names. According to Thomas Edge, an early 17th-century whaling captain who was often inaccurate, "William  Hudson" discovered the island in 1608 and named it "Hudson's Touches" (or "Tutches"). However, the well-known explorer Henry Hudson could only have come by on his voyage in 1607 (if he had made an illogical detour) and he made no mention of it in his journal.

According to William Scoresby (1820: p. 154), referring to the mistaken belief that the Dutch had discovered the island in 1611, Hull whalers discovered the island "about the same time" and named it "Trinity Island". Muller (1874: pp. 190–191) took this to mean they had come upon Jan Mayen in 1611 or 1612, which was repeated by many subsequent authors. There were, in fact, no Hull whalers in either of these years, the first Hull whaling expedition having been sent to the island only in 1616 (see below). As with the previous claim made by Edge, there is no cartographical or written proof for this supposed discovery.

During the Golden Age of Dutch exploration and discovery (c. 1590s–1720s)

First verified discoveries: mapping and naming

The first verified discoveries of Jan Mayen, by three separate expeditions, occurred in the summer of 1614, probably within one month of each other. The Dutchman Fopp Gerritsz, whilst in command of a whaling expedition sent out by the Englishman John Clarke, of Dunkirk, claimed (in 1631) to have discovered the island on 28 June and named it "Isabella". In January the Noordsche Compagnie (Northern Company), modelled on the Dutch East India Company, had been established to support Dutch whaling in the Arctic. Two of its ships, financed by merchants from Amsterdam and Enkhuizen, reached Jan Mayen in July 1614. The captains of these ships—Jan Jacobszoon May van Schellinkhout (after whom the island was ultimately named) on the Gouden Cath (Golden Cat), and Jacob de Gouwenaer on the Orangienboom (Orange Tree)—named it Mr. Joris Eylant after the Dutch cartographer Joris Carolus who was on board and mapped the island. The captains acknowledged that a third Dutch ship, the Cleyn Swaentgen (Little Swan) captained by Jan Jansz Kerckhoff and financed by Noordsche Compagnie shareholders from Delft, had already been at the island when they arrived. They had assumed the latter, who named the island Maurits Eylandt (or Mauritius) after Maurice of Nassau, Prince of Orange, would report their discovery to the States General. However, the Delft merchants had decided to keep the discovery secret and returned in 1615 to hunt for their own profit. The ensuing dispute was only settled in 1617, though both companies were allowed to whale at Jan Mayen in the meantime.

In 1615, the English whaler Robert Fotherby went ashore. Apparently thinking he had made a new discovery, he named the island "Sir Thomas Smith's Island" and the volcano "Mount Hakluyt". On a map of c. 1634, Jean Vrolicq renamed the island Île de Richelieu.

Jan Mayen first appeared on Willem Jansz Blaeu's 1620 edition map of Europe, originally published by Cornelis Doedz in 1606. Blaeu, who lived in Amsterdam, named it "Jan Mayen" after captain Jan Jacobszoon May van Schellinkhout of the Amsterdam-financed Gouden Cath. Blaeu made the first detailed map of the island in his famous "Zeespiegel" atlas of 1623, establishing its current name.

Dutch whaling base

From 1615 to 1638, Jan Mayen was used as a whaling base by the Dutch Noordsche Compagnie, which had been given a monopoly on whaling in the Arctic regions by the States General in 1614. Only two ships, one from the Noordsche Compagnie, and the other from the Delft merchants, were off Jan Mayen in 1615. The following year a score of vessels were sent to the island. The Noordsche Compagnie sent eight ships escorted by three warships under Jan Jacobsz. Schrobop; while the Delft merchants sent up five ships under Adriaen Dircksz. Leversteyn, son of one of the above merchants. There were also two ships from Dunkirk sent by John Clarke, as well as a ship each from London and Hull.

Heertje Jansz, master of the Hope, of Enkhuizen, wrote a day-by-day account of the season. The ships took two weeks to reach Jan Mayen, arriving early in June. On 15 June they met the two English ships, which Schrobop allowed to remain, on condition they gave half their catch to the Dutch. The ships from Dunkirk were given the same conditions. By late July the first ship had left with a full cargo of whale oil; the rest left early in August, several filled with oil.

That year 200 men were seasonally living and working on the island at six temporary whaling stations (spread along the northwest coast). During the first decade of whaling, more than ten ships visited Jan Mayen each year, while in the second period (1624 and later) five to ten ships were sent. With the exception of a few ships from Dunkirk, which came to the island in 1617 and were either driven away or forced to give a third of their catch to the Dutch, only the Dutch and merchants from Hull sent up ships to Jan Mayen from 1616 onward. In 1624 ten wooden houses were built in South Bay. About this time the Dutch appear to have abandoned the temporary stations consisting of tents of sail and crude furnaces, replacing them with two semi-permanent stations with wooden storehouses and dwellings and large brick furnaces, one in the above-mentioned South Bay and the other in the North Bay. In 1628 two forts were built to protect the stations. Among the sailors active at Jan Mayen was the later admiral Michiel Adriaensz de Ruyter. In 1633, at the age of 26, he was for the first time listed as an officer aboard de Groene Leeuw (The Green Lion). He again went to Jan Mayen in 1635, aboard the same ship.

In 1632 the Noordsche Compagnie expelled the Danish-employed Basque whalers from Spitsbergen. In revenge, the latter sailed to Jan Mayen, where the Dutch had left for the winter, to plunder the Dutch equipment and burn down the settlements and factories. Captain Outger Jacobsz of Grootebroek was asked to stay the next winter (1633/34) on Jan Mayen with six shipmates to defend the island. While a group with the same task survived the winter on Spitsbergen, all seven on Jan Mayen died of scurvy or trichinosis (from eating raw polar bear meat) combined with the harsh conditions.

During the first phase of whaling the hauls were generally good, some exceptional. For example, Mathijs Jansz. Hoepstock caught 44 whales in Hoepstockbukta in 1619, which produced 2,300 casks of whale oil. During the second phase the hauls were much lower. While 1631 turned out to be a very good season, the following year, due to the weather and ice, only eight whales were caught. In 1633 eleven ships managed to catch just 47 whales; while a meager 42 were caught by the same number in 1635. The bowhead whale was locally hunted to near-extinction around 1640 (approximately 1000 had been killed and processed on the island), at which time Jan Mayen was abandoned and stayed uninhabited for two and a half centuries.

19th and 20th centuries

During the International Polar Year 1882–1883 the Austro-Hungarian North Pole Expedition stayed one year at Jan Mayen. The expedition performed extensive mapping of the area, their maps being of such quality that they were used until the 1950s. The Austrian polar station on Jan Mayen Island was built and equipped in 1882 fully at Count Wilczek's own expense.

Polar bears appear on Jan Mayen, although in diminished numbers compared with earlier times. Between 1900 and 1920, there were a number of Norwegian trappers spending winters on Jan Mayen, hunting Arctic foxes in addition to some polar bears. But the exploitation soon made the profits decline, and the hunting ended. Polar bears in this region of the Arctic are genetically distinguishable from those living elsewhere.

The League of Nations gave Norway jurisdiction over the island, and in 1921 Norway opened the first meteorological station. The Norwegian Meteorological Institute annexed the middle part of the island for Norway in 1922 and the whole island in 1926 when Hallvard Devold was head of the weather observations base on the island. On 27 February 1930, the island was made de jure a part of the Kingdom of Norway.

During World War II, continental Norway was invaded and occupied by Germany in spring 1940. The four-man team on Jan Mayen stayed at their posts and in an act of defiance began sending their weather reports to the United Kingdom instead of Norway. The British codenamed Jan Mayen 'Island X' and attempted to reinforce it with troops to counteract any German attack. The Norwegian patrol boat  ran aground on Nansenflua, one of the islands' many uncharted lava reefs and the 68-man crew abandoned ship and joined the Norwegian team on shore. The British expedition commander, prompted by the loss of the gunboat, decided to abandon Jan Mayen until the following spring and radioed for a rescue ship. Within a few days a ship arrived and evacuated the four Norwegians and their would-be reinforcements, after demolishing the weather station to prevent it from falling into German hands. The Germans attempted to land a weather team on the island on 16 November 1940; the German naval trawler carrying the team crashed on the rocks just off Jan Mayen after a patrolling British destroyer had picked them up on radar. The detection was not by chance, as the German plan had been compromised from the beginning with British wireless interceptors of the Radio Security Service following the communications of the Abwehr (the German Intelligence service) concerning the operation, and the destroyer had been waiting. Most of the crew struggled ashore and were taken prisoner by a landing party from the destroyer.

The Allies returned to the island on 10 March 1941, when the Norwegian ship Veslekari, escorted by the patrol boat Honningsvaag, dropped 12 Norwegian weathermen on the island. The team's radio transmissions soon betrayed its presence to the Axis, and German planes from Norway began to bomb and strafe Jan Mayen whenever weather permitted, but did little damage. Soon supplies and reinforcements arrived, and even some anti-aircraft guns, giving the island a garrison of a few dozen weathermen and soldiers. By 1941, Germany had given up hope of evicting the Allies from the island and the constant air raids stopped.

On 7 August 1942, a German Focke-Wulf Fw 200 "Condor", probably on a mission to bomb the station, crashed into the nearby mountainside of Danielssenkrateret in fog, killing its crew of nine. In 1950, the wreck of another German plane with four crew members was discovered on the southwest side of the island. In 1943, the Americans established a radio locating station named Atlantic City in the north to try to locate German radio bases in Greenland.

After the war, the meteorological station was located at Atlantic City, but moved in 1949 to a new location. Radio Jan Mayen also served as an important radio station for ship traffic in the Arctic Ocean. In 1959 NATO started building the LORAN-C network in sites on the Atlantic Ocean; one of the transmitters was to be on Jan Mayen. By 1961 the new military installations, including a new airfield, were operational.

For some time scientists doubted that the Beerenberg volcano would become active, but in 1970 it erupted for about three weeks, adding another  of land mass to the island. It also erupted in 1973 and 1985.

Historic stations and huts on the island are Hoyberg, Vera, Olsbu, Puppebu (cabin), Gamlemetten or Gamlestasjonen (the old weather station), Jan Mayen Radio, Helenehytta, Margarethhytta, and Ulla (a cabin at the foot of the Beerenberg).

Environment

Nature reserve
A regulation dating from 2010 renders the island a nature reserve under Norwegian jurisdiction. The aim of this regulation is to ensure the preservation of a pristine Arctic island and the marine life nearby, including the ocean floor. Landings at Jan Mayen can be done by boat. However, this is permitted only at a small part of the island, named Båtvika (Boat Bay). As there is no commercial airline operating at the island, one cannot get there by plane except by chartering one. Permission for landings by a charter plane has to be obtained in advance. Permission to stay on the island has to be obtained in advance, and is generally limited to a few days (or even hours). Putting up a tent or setting up camp is prohibited. There is a separate regulation for the stay of foreigners.

Geography and geology

Jan Mayen consists of two geographically distinct parts. South-Jan is narrow, comparatively flat and unglaciated. The station and living quarters are located on South-Jan. The island lies at the northern end of the Jan Mayen Microcontinent. The microcontinent was originally part of the Greenland Plate, but now forms part of the Eurasian Plate.

Important Bird Area
The island was identified as an Important Bird Area (IBA) by BirdLife International because it is a breeding site for large numbers of seabirds, supporting populations of northern fulmars (78,000–160,000 pairs), little auks (10,000–100,000 pairs), thick-billed guillemot (74,000–147,000 pairs) and black guillemots (100–1,000 pairs).

Climate
Jan Mayen has an oceanic polar climate with a Köppen classification of ET, sometimes reckoned as EM (maritime polar). Jan Mayen is situated in between the cold East Greenland Current to the west and the warm Gulf Stream to the east of the island, and is the only landmass in the northern hemisphere where warm and cold ocean currents meet. The deep snow cover prevents any permafrost from developing. As a result of warming, the 1991-2020 temperature normal shows a mean annual temperature  warmer than during 1961-1990, pushing the annual temperature above freezing.

In popular culture 
Jan Mayen is featured as an easter egg in several grand strategy video games published by Paradox Interactive, such as Europa Universalis IV. In Europa Universalis IV, typing "bearhaslanded" into the command console will spawn Jan Mayen as a country in a random location. Players can also specify where Jan Mayen will spawn by including a province ID in the command.

See also

 List of islands of Norway
 List of islands of Norway by area
 Svalbard
 Svalbard and Jan Mayen

Citations

General and cited references 
 Ledgard, J. M. (2011). Submergence. Coffee House Press.
 Umbreit, Andreas (2005). Spitsbergen: Svalbard – Franz Josef Land – Jan Mayen, 3rd ed. Chalfont St. Peter: Bradt Travel Guides. .

External links

 "Jan Mayen". The World Factbook. Central Intelligence Agency.
 
 www.jan-mayen.no 
 Jan.Mayen.no
 Jan Mayen year round webcam 
 Jan Mayen at Norwegian Polar Institute
 TopoJanMayen – Interactive map of Jan Mayen by the Norwegian Polar Institute
 Photographs and information on Jan Mayen
 Satellite Radar image of Jan Mayen
 Glaciers of Jan Mayen
 www.janmayen2011.org - a site about JX5O - international ham radio expedition to Jan Mayen island in 2011
 
 Weather forecasts for Jan Mayen at yr.no (Norwegian Meteorological institute and NRK)
 USCG Spar 403 1966

 
1614 in the Dutch Empire
17th century in the Dutch Republic
Important Bird Areas of Arctic islands
Important Bird Areas of Atlantic islands
Important Bird Areas of Norwegian overseas territories
Integral overseas territories
Islands of Norway
Islands of the Arctic Ocean
Maritime history of the Dutch Republic
Mid-Atlantic Ridge
Ridge volcanoes
Seabird colonies
Volcanism of Norway